Mikaël Mitraille is a Mauritian footballer.

Career
A forward, Mitraille currently plays at the club level for Curepipe Starlight SC in the Mauritian Premier League. He is also a member of the Mauritius national football team.

In addition, Mitraille is also featured on the Mauritian national team in the official 2010 FIFA World Cup video game.

References 

Living people
Mauritius international footballers
Mauritian footballers
Mauritian Premier League players
Curepipe Starlight SC players
Savanne SC players
Association football forwards
Year of birth missing (living people)